St Felicitas and St Piala’s Church, Phillack is a Grade II* listed parish church in the Church of England Diocese of Truro in Phillack, Cornwall, England, UK.

History

The church dates from the 12th century. The tower is 15th century. It was rebuilt between 1856 and 1857 by William White and re-consecrated on 12 May 1857.

Parish status

The church is in a joint parish with
St Erth's Church, St Erth
St Gwinear’s Church, Gwinear
St Elwyn's Church, Hayle
St Gothian's Church, Gwithian

Organ

The church contains an organ by Heard and Son of Truro dating from 1905. A specification of the organ can be found on the National Pipe Organ Register.

Links

References

Phillack
Phillack
Grade II* listed buildings in Cornwall
National Heritage List for England
Buildings and structures in Cornwall